Stolberg (Rheinland) Hauptbahnhof is a railway station on the line between Cologne and Aachen. It is the largest station for passengers and freight in the town of Stolberg (Rhineland) in the urban region of Aachen in the German state of North Rhine-Westphalia. It houses the Vennbahn Museum and is situated at a junction.

Routes
Stolberger Hauptbahnhof is at the junction of four lines. The high-speed line between Cologne and Aachen runs from the east, first through the freight yard and then through the passenger station, and continues to the west. The Mönchengladbach–Stolberg line, called locally the Eschweiler Valley Railway also runs into the station from the east. The Stolberg–Herzogenrath line runs from the north, first crossing the line between Cologne and Aachen and running to south of the main line to the west end of the station. The former Stolberg–Kohlscheid line also branched off this line at Quinx junction between Stolberg and Würselen-Merzbrück. The fourth line is the Stolberg–Eupen line, which leaves the station and runs to the south.

History

The then single-track railway line between Cologne and Aachen was opened by the Rhenish Railway Company (RHE) to Stolberg in 1841 with Stolberg station built in Eilendorf about one kilometre from the northern border of the town of Stolberg and therefore poorly located for the Stolberg valley. In 1870 the Bergisch-Märkische Railway Company (Bergisch-Märkische Eisenbahn-Gesellschaft, BME) opened the first part of the Hochneukirch–Stolberg line (known as the Eschweiler Talbahn, “Eschweiler Valley Railway”)—from Mönchengladbach, reaching Stolberg in 1875, where Stolberg BME station was built a few hundred metres south of Stolberg RHE station. Another short line was opened mainly for freight to Münsterbusch to the southwest of Stolberg in 1887 with its station near the other Stolberg stations.

The present station was built between 1886 and 1888 by the Prussian state railways. It replaced the previous three stations on the four different lines. In 1935 the station became part of the area of the city of Stolberg and since then it has been called Stolberg (Rheinland) Hauptbahnhof.

Current operations
The Stolberg Hauptbahnhof is served by following passenger services:

Thalys services between Paris and Cologne and Intercity-Express services between Frankfurt and Brussels pass through without stopping.

References

External links
 
 
 
 
 

Railway stations in North Rhine-Westphalia
Stolberg (Rhineland)
Railway stations in Germany opened in 1888